Clauss is a surname. Notable people with the surname include:

Al Clauss, Major League Baseball player in 1915
Alfred Clauss (1906-1998), German-born architect
Carin Clauss (born January 24, 1939), American lawyer and legal scholar
Jane West Clauss (1907–2003), American architect and educator
Jared Clauss, American Football player
Pamela Clauss, Australian nurse
Paul Clauss (1868-1945), Scotland and British Isles rugby union player
Roy Clauss, surgeon

See also
Clauss Cutlery Company, scissors and shears manufacturer
Achaia Clauss, Greek winery
Claus

Surnames from given names